Waterford School District is a school district headquartered in Waterford Township, Michigan.

History
Waterford Township lays claim to the first public school in Oakland County.  That school was established in 1821 on the shores of Silver Lake with seven students.  That number grew to thirteen when its first permanent home, a log schoolhouse, was dedicated the next year.  Ira Donelson, for whom Donelson Hills Elementary is named, was elected as the township's first Supervisor of Education in 1835, the year Waterford Township was organized.  As the township grew, more schoolhouses were built, including Drayton Plains in 1865, Four Towns in 1866 and Waterford Center in 1869

While one-room schoolhouses were the norm during the rural 19th century, multiroom school buildings became the norm as Waterford transitioned into a suburban community.  The first was the Waterford School, built in 1910 and expanded in 1927 and later to be renamed Waterford Village Elementary (which was closed in 2014); Four Towns and Waterford Center moved to new and larger school buildings within the next few decades, while the new Drayton Plains School opened in 1920.  The hope was to consolidate these schools in a single district with the possible addition of a high school—Waterford's high school students then attended either Clarkston High School or Pontiac High School—but the Great Depression and then World War II postponed consolidation until 1944, when the present Waterford School District was formed.  By then, the Williams Lake School, the fifth of the original schools in the district, was completed in 1943.

Attention was then turned to building a high school for Waterford Township, which doubled in population during the 1940s.  For the first several years after Waterford Township High School was established in 1947, kindergarten through sixth grade attended Four Towns, Waterford Village, Williams Lake or Waterford Center, while the high school was based at Drayton Plains School until a permanent home, on the corner of M-59 and Crescent Lake Road, was completed in 1950. Also in the early 1950s, Issac E. Crary Junior High became the first junior high school in the district.

At its peak in the 1970s, Waterford School District contained twenty-seven elementary schools, three junior schools (which became middle schools in 1990); Crary (which transitioned to an administrative building in 2010), Pierce and Mason, and three high schools; Waterford Township (which closed in 1983), Kettering and Mott.  As of 2016, there were nine elementary schools, two middle schools and three high schools.

Schools

High schools
 Waterford Kettering High School (opened 1961)
 Waterford Mott High School (opened 1967)
 Waterford Durant High School (opened 2012 credit recovery)

Middle schools
 Stevens T. Mason Middle School (opened 1965)
 John D. Pierce Middle School (opened 1957)

Elementary schools
 William Beaumont Elementary School
 Thomas M. Cooley Elementary School
 Donelson Hills Elementary School
 David Grayson Elementary School
 Laura S. Haviland Elementary School
 Douglass Houghton Elementary School
Patricia E. Knudsen Elementary School
 Riverside Elementary School
 Henry R. Schoolcraft Elementary School

Early childhood centers
 Stepanski Early Childhood Center

References

External links
 

Education in Oakland County, Michigan
School districts in Michigan
1945 establishments in Michigan
School districts established in 1945